Simon Biwott (born 3 March 1970 in Eldoret, Uasin Gishu District) is a former long-distance runner from Kenya who won the silver medal in the men's marathon at the 2001 World Championships in Athletics. The race in Edmonton, Canada was won by Ethiopia's reigning Olympic champion Gezahegne Abera. A year later, Biwott won the Rotterdam Marathon. He also won marathons in Cancún, Mexico City (1998), Berlin, Milan (2000), and Paris (2001). After his career in athletics, he started a private school in Eldoret. His personal best of 2:06:49 was run at the 2002 edition of the Berlin Marathon.

He was a surprise winner at the 2000 Berlin Marathon, having only entered as a pacemaker originally.

Achievements

References

External links

marathoninfo
 Runner's Web

1970 births
Living people
Kenyan male long-distance runners
Kenyan male marathon runners
Paris Marathon male winners
World Athletics Championships athletes for Kenya
World Athletics Championships medalists
Berlin Marathon male winners
Pacemakers
People from Uasin Gishu County